Arkas is a rural locality (a selo) in Buynaksky District, Republic of Dagestan, Russia. The population was 1,676 as of 2010. There are 5 streets.

Geography 
Arkas is located 25 km south of Buynaksk (the district's administrative centre) by road. Arykhkent is the nearest rural locality.

References 

Rural localities in Buynaksky District